At the Battle of Bạch Đằng River in 938 near Hạ Long Bay in northern Vietnam the military force of the Vietnamese Principality of Jinghai, led by Ngô Quyền, a Vietnamese lord, defeated the invading forces of the Chinese state of Southern Han and put an end to centuries of Chinese imperial domination in Vietnam during the Five Dynasties and Ten Kingdoms period. It was considered the turning point in Vietnamese history.

Background 
In October 930, Southern Han, a Chinese state in southern China during the Five Dynasties and Ten Kingdoms period, launched an attack on the Jinghai circuit, which at the time was a Vietnamese principality controlled by the Viet Khúc clan. The leader of the Khuc, Khúc Thừa Mỹ, was taken prisoner by the Southern Han Emperor Liu Yan. In 931, the local general Dương Đình Nghệ  raised a 3,000-men army of retainers and drove the Southern Han back to the borders of the Jinghai Circuit. 

In 937, Đình Nghệ was assassinated by Kiều Công Tiễn, a formal military officer. Đình Nghệ's son in law and also his general, Ngô Quyền, mobilized his army to overthrow Kiều Công Tiễn. Công Tiễn called Liu Yan for support. Liu Yan then put his son Liu Hongcao in command of the expedition, granting him the titles Jinghai jiedushi and King of Jiao, dispatching a fleet and sailing to the Gulf of Tonkin, headed inland up Bạch Đằng River, the water gate of Annam. Liu Yan himself led an additional force following his son's fleet.

Battle 
In late 938, the Southern Han fleet led by Prince Liu Hongcao met Ngô Quyền's fleet on the gate of the Bạch Đằng River. The Southern Han fleet consisted fast warships carrying fifty men on each–twenty sailors, twenty five warriors, and two crossbowmen. Ngô Quyền and his force had set up massive stakes tipped with iron foiled points on the river bed. When the river tide rose, the sharpened stakes were covered by water. As the Southern Han sailed into the estuary, Vietnamese in smaller crafts went down and harassed the Chinese warships, luring them to follow upstream. When the tide fell, Ngô Quyền's force counterattacked and pushed the Chinese fleet back to the sea. The Southern Han ships now were stuck in the stakes and became immobilized. Half of the Han army were killed and drowned, including Liu Hongcao. When the news of the defeat reached Liu Yan on the sea by his survived soldiers, he learned that his troops were not lucky, and then retreated back to Guangzhou.

Aftermath 
In spring 939, Ngô Quyền proclaimed himself king and chose the antiquity town of Co Loa as the capital. The Jinghai Principality de facto became independent, and Vietnamese history comes into its own. Southern Han never attacked Annam again. The tactics of Ngô Quyền would be reused by Prince Tran Quoc Tuan 300 years later against the Mongol-led Yuan invasion in 1288.

See also
 Battle of Bạch Đằng (1288)

References

Citations

Bibliography

External links
 Xa Bach Dang Dong Hung Thai Binh Viet Nam

Ngô dynasty
Bạch Đằng
Battles of Southern Han
938
10th century in China
Bạch Đằng
Bạch Đằng
10th century in Vietnam
Wars between China and Vietnam
Riverine warfare
Bạch Đằng
Military campaigns involving Vietnam
Invasions of Vietnam